Matías Gastón Castro (born 18 December 1991) is an Argentine-Chilean professional footballer who plays as a striker for Paraguayan club Sportivo Luqueño.

Career
On 2021, he joined Colombian club Independiente de Santa Fe. In 2022, he moved to Jordanian club Al-Wehdat. On second half 2022, he returned to South America and signed with Montevideo Wanderers.

In February 2023, he joined Paraguayan side Sportivo Luqueño.

Personal life
He holds dual nationality: Argentine-Chilean. On 2017, he acquired the Chilean nationality by descent according to the Chilean law, due to the fact that his paternal grandfather is Chilean.

Honours
Ionikos
 Super League Greece 2: 2020–21

References

External links
 
 
 
 Matías Gastón Castro at playmakerstats.com (English version of ceroacero.es)

1991 births
Living people
People from Neuquén
Argentine footballers
Argentine expatriate footballers
Argentine sportspeople of Chilean descent
Citizens of Chile through descent
Naturalized citizens of Chile
Chilean footballers
Chilean expatriate footballers
Torneo Argentino A players
Primera Nacional players
Comisión de Actividades Infantiles footballers
Torneo Federal A players
El Porvenir footballers
Defensores de Cambaceres footballers
Uruguayan Primera División players
Danubio F.C. players
C.S.D. Villa Española players
Montevideo Wanderers F.C. players
Argentine Primera División players
Unión de Santa Fe footballers
Chilean Primera División players
Unión La Calera footballers
Primera B de Chile players
San Marcos de Arica footballers
Super League Greece players
Super League Greece 2 players
Xanthi F.C. players
Ionikos F.C. players
Categoría Primera A players
Independiente Santa Fe footballers
Jordanian Pro League players
Al-Wehdat SC players
Paraguayan Primera División players
Sportivo Luqueño players
Expatriate footballers in Uruguay
Expatriate footballers in Chile
Expatriate footballers in Greece
Expatriate footballers in Colombia
Expatriate footballers in Jordan
Expatriate footballers in Paraguay
Argentine expatriate sportspeople in Uruguay
Argentine expatriate sportspeople in Chile
Argentine expatriate sportspeople in Greece
Argentine expatriate sportspeople in Colombia
Argentine expatriate sportspeople in Jordan
Argentine expatriate sportspeople in Paraguay
Chilean expatriate sportspeople in Uruguay
Chilean expatriate sportspeople in Greece
Chilean expatriate sportspeople in Colombia
Chilean expatriate sportspeople in Jordan
Chilean expatriate sportspeople in Paraguay
Association football forwards